Elmslie William Dallas FRSE (27 June 1809 – 26 January 1879) was a British artist, teacher and photographer.

Life
The second son of William Dallas of Lloyd's and Sarah Day, he was born in London on 27 June 1809. He was descended from Alexander Dallas of Cantray, Inverness-shire. He went to school at Inverness Academy. He was admitted a student of the Royal Academy in 1831, leaving in 1834 with a gold medal and a travelling studentship.

Dallas settled in Edinburgh, where he lived firstly at 125 Princes Street a house facing Edinburgh Castle.

His last picture was exhibited in 1858. For some years he was also a teacher in the Edinburgh School of Design there, until his retirement in 1858 on the affiliation of the school with the Science and Art Department.

He married late in life (1859) to Jane Fordyce Rose.

He died on 26 January 1879 at Deanbank House in Stockbridge, Edinburgh.

Works

Dallas's first picture, the interior of a Roman convent, hung in the Royal Academy in 1838. In 1840 he assisted Ludwig Grüner in the decoration of the garden pavilion at Buckingham Palace, painting a series of views of Melrose, Abbotsford, Loch Awe, Aros Castle, and Windermere Lake, in illustration of the writings of Walter Scott. In 1841–2 he first exhibited in the Royal Scottish Academy. His major pictures were highly studied interiors and medieval subjects. He also painted landscapes, notably of the Campagna.

For teaching Dallas wrote a work on "Applied Geometry". In 1851 he was elected a Fellow of the Royal Society of Edinburgh, his proposer being Philip Kelland. In the Society he read papers on the structure of diatomacea, on crystallogenesis, and on the optics of lenses.

Family
In 1859, Dallas married Jane Fordyce, daughter of James Rose, writer to the signet, of Dean Bank, Edinburgh.

Notes

External links

Attribution

1809 births
1879 deaths
Landscape artists
Fellows of the Royal Society of Edinburgh
19th-century British painters
British male painters
19th-century British male artists